Malakai Rakula (born 16 May 1992) is a Fijian footballer who plays as a midfielder for Manukau United in New Zealand and the Fiji national team.

Club career
Rakula started his career with Suva. After a stint with Nadi he plays for Ba since 2016. With both Nadi and Ba he has played in the OFC Champions League.

On 1 February 2020, Rakula went on a trial at Manukau United FC in New Zealand together with his teammate from Ba F.C. and the national team, Kishan Sami. Both players signed a one-year deal with the club on 10 February 2020. Both players made their debut on 13 March 2020 in a friendly match.

National team
Rakula was called up by coach Christophe Gamel in 2019 for the national football team. He made his debut on March 18, 2019, in a 3–0 win against New Caledonia. He started the game and was subbed after 75 minutes by Josateki Tamudu

International goals
Scores and results list Fiji's goal tally first.

References

External links
 

Fijian footballers
Fijian expatriate footballers
Association football midfielders
Suva F.C. players
Nadi F.C. players
Ba F.C. players
Fiji international footballers
Living people
1992 births
Expatriate association footballers in New Zealand